Celestino Prieto (born 29 January 1961) is a Spanish former professional racing cyclist. He rode in six editions of the Tour de France and six editions of the Vuelta a España.

References

External links

1961 births
Living people
Spanish male cyclists
Cyclists from Barcelona